Sigma Sigma Phi ( or SSP), is the national osteopathic medicine honors fraternity for medical students training to be Doctors of Osteopathic Medicine (D.O.). The National Osteopathic Medicine Honors Fraternity is a group united in the interest of preserving the highest class of medical scholastic excellence and includes community service.

Sigma Sigma Phi was founded in 1921, and the fraternity's goal is to directly impact the student bodies by encouraging the highest class of academic excellence. Criteria for membership into Sigma Sigma Phi include scholastic achievement, such as class rank and dedication to community service and the highest class of academic excellence.

History
Sigma Sigma Phi was founded by seven students representing the fraternal organizations and the student body in October 1921 in Kirksville, Missouri at what is currently A.T. Still University (originally named American School of Osteopathy). These seven students constituted the original charter members, one from each fraternity and one from the nonfraternal body, and drew up the organization's constitution and by-laws. The fraternity was officially chartered on May 16, 1925, at Des Moines University College of Osteopathic Medicine by three men. Thus, there were ten charter members. Over the years, most osteopathic medical schools have added a local chapter. Currently, there are 22 active chapters at 24 osteopathic medical school campuses in the United States.

Fraternity objectives

 To further the science of Osteopathic Medicine and its standards of practice.
 To preserve the meaning of and encourage scholastic excellence.
 To continue a high degree of fellowship among its students.
 To cultivate relationships and understanding between the student bodies and officials, such as Faculty members of our Colleges.
 To foster allegiance to the American Osteopathic Association.
 To perpetuate Sigma Sigma Phi by preserving the principles and objectives of the organization.

Criteria for admission
Minimum criteria set by the grand chapter include:
 Student chapter membership shall not exceed 25% of the total of the 1st, 2nd, 3rd, & 4th year classes.
 Must be an osteopathic medical student (a D.O. student).
 Must have successfully completed at least one semester of classroom work with high standards.
 Must believe in a high degree of scholarship and service to college and/or profession.

However, each chapter is free to set their own, more stringent, requirements for admission. Many chapters have implemented a GPA requirement of at least a 3.5 or 90 average. Additionally, applicants must have a demonstrated commitment to community service. Once initiated, members must fulfill their chapters community services requirements or risk expulsion from the fraternity.

There are approximately 3,600 members.

Activities 
The e-board has conducted four main activities since its election in March 2017: hosting a free neighborhood health fair; teaching CPR and first aid to boy scouts; holding a culinary party to collect funds for charity; and getting in a sign-language interpreter to introduce sign-language medical terms to the pupils.

Symbols
Colors:crimson red and royal blue representing virility and loyalty
Flower:the red carnation

Chapters
Chapters of Sigma Sigma Phi 
Alpha chapter -A. T. Still University: Kirksville College of Osteopathic Medicine (1921)
Alpha Alpha chapter - Lake Erie College of Osteopathic Medicine Bradenton
Alpha Beta chapter - Alabama College of Osteopathic Medicine (June 2015)
Alpha Mu chapter - William Carey University College of Osteopathic Medicine (October 2012)
Alpha Omega chapter - Liberty University College of Osteopathic Medicine (February 2015)
Alpha Rho chapter - Arkansas College of Osteopathic Medicine (September 2018)
Beta chapter - Des Moines University College of Osteopathic Medicine (1925)
Beta Chi chapter - Burrell College of Osteopathic Medicine (November 2017)
Chi chapter - Edward Via College of Osteopathic Medicine (October 2006)
Chi chapter - Auburn branch - Edward Via College of Osteopathic Medicine, Auburn Campus (Fall 2015)
Chi chapter - Spartansburg branch - Edward Via Virginia of Osteopathic Medicine, Carolinas Campus (October 2012)
Chi Upsilon chapter - Campbell University Jerry M Wallace School of Osteopathic Medicine (August 2017)
Delta chapter - Kansas City University of Medicine and Biosciences College of Osteopathic Medicine (1932)
Delta chapter - Joplin Additional Site - Kansas City University of Medicine and Biosciences Joplin (May 2018)
Epsilon chapter - Chicago College of Osteopathic Medicine of Midwestern University (1939)
Eta chapter - University of North Texas Health Science Center - Ft. Worth
Gamma chapter - Lake Erie College of Osteopathic Medicine (2002)
Gamma chapter - Seton Hill Additional Site - LECOM at Seton Hill (October 2016)
Gamma chapter- Lakewood Ranch Additional Site - LECOM at Bradenton  (February 2012)
Gamma Delta chapter - Pacific Northwest University College of Osteopathic Medicine (April 2011)
Iota chapter - Michigan State University College of Osteopathic Medicine 
Kappa chapter - University of New England College of Osteopathic Medicine
Lambda chapter - Ohio University Heritage College of Osteopathic Medicine
Lambda chapter - Cleveland Additional Site- Ohio University Heritage College of Osteopathic Medicine, Cleveland (September 2019)
Lambda chapter - Dublin Additional Site - Ohio University Heritage College of Osteopathic Medicine, Dublin (September 2016)
Mu chapter - Western University of Health Sciences College of Osteopathic Medicine of the Pacific
Mu chapter - Lebanon Additional Site Western University of Health Sciences College of Osteopathic Medicine of the Pacific Northwest
Mu Upsilon chapter - Marian University College of Osteopathic Medicine (December 2014)
Nu chapter - West Virginia School of Osteopathic Medicine
Omega chapter - New York College of Osteopathic Medicine of the New York Institute of Technology (reactivated February 16, 2008)
Omega Chapter -Jonesboro Additional Site- New York Institute of Technology College of Osteopathic Medicine|New York College of Osteopathic Medicine of the New York Institute of Technology Jonesboro Arkansas (Spring 2019)
Omicron chapter Rowan-Virtua School of Osteopathic Medicine
Omicron Theta chapter Rocky Vista University College of Osteopathic Medicine (September 2011)
Omicron Theta - Ivins Additional Site - Rocky Vista University College of Osteopathic Medicine , Ivins Utah Campus (September 2019)
Phi chapter Lincoln Memorial University - DeBusk College of Osteopathic Medicine (February 2008)
Pi chapter - Touro University College of Osteopathic Medicine, Nevada
Psi chapter - Touro University College of Osteopathic Medicine, New York
Psi chapter - Miiddleton Additional Site - Touro College of Osteopathic Medicine-Middletown (February 2017)
Rho chapter - Arizona College of Osteopathic Medicine of Midwestern University 
Sigma chapter - University of Pikeville Kentucky College of Osteopathic Medicine (October 2003)
Tau chapter - Touro University California College of Osteopathic Medicine (October 2006)
Tau chapter - Henderson Additional Site - Touro University California College of Osteopathic Medicine, Henderson (October 2009)
Theta chapter - Oklahoma State University Center for Health Sciences College of Osteopathic Medicine
Upsilon chapter - A.T. Still University: School of Osteopathic Medicine in Arizona
Xi chapter - Nova Southeastern University College of Osteopathic Medicine
Zeta chapter - Philadelphia College of Osteopathic Medicine
Zeta Alpha chapter - Philadelphia College of Osteopathic Medicine, Georgia Campus

Similar organizations

Alpha Omega Alpha, abbreviated "AOA", is the counterpart honor society for Doctor of Medicine (M.D.) medical students, residents, and physicians in the United States.
"AOA" is also the abbreviation used by the American Osteopathic Association, which is the medical association for osteopathic medical students, residents, and physicians.

Omega Beta Iota, abbreviated “ΩΒΙ,” is the National Osteopathic Political Action Honor Society founded in 2007 to emphasize the importance of the work osteopathic medical students do for the political system. A distinction is made when referring to the National Osteopathic Medicine Honors Fraternity in that Sigma Sigma Phi, abbreviated "ΣΣΦ", is a group united in the interest of preserving the highest class of scholastic excellence and includes community service.

Gold Humanism Honor Society, abbreviated "GHHS."

See also
 Fraternities and sororities in North America

References

External links
ΣΣΦ national website

Honor societies
Medical education in the United States
Osteopathic medical associations in the United States
Des Moines University
1921 establishments in Missouri
Student organizations established in 1921